The 2000 China Open was a professional ranking snooker tournament that took place from 9–17 December 2000 at the Mission Hills Resort in Shenzhen, China. It was the fourth ranking event of the 2000/2001 season.

The reigning champion was Ronnie O'Sullivan, who retained his title by defeating Mark Williams in the final 9–3.


Wildcard round

Main draw

Final

References

2000
China Open
Open (snooker)
Sport in Shenzhen
Sports competitions in Guangdong